Joshua Lemos (born May 4, 1989) is a Canadian futsal player who plays as a goalkeeper for the Canada national team. He also plays professional indoor soccer for the Milwaukee Wave.

Early life
Lemos was born in Brampton, Ontario to a Uruguayan father and a Canadian mother and raised in neighbouring Toronto.

References

1989 births
Living people
Soccer players from Brampton
Soccer players from Toronto
Canadian soccer players
Association football goalkeepers
Diriangén FC players
Nicaraguan Primera División players
Canadian expatriate  soccer players
Canadian expatriates in Nicaragua
Expatriate footballers in Nicaragua
Canadian men's futsal players
Futsal goalkeepers
Canadian people of Uruguayan descent
Sportspeople of Uruguayan descent
Milwaukee Wave players
Major Arena Soccer League players
Canadian expatriate sportspeople in the United States
Expatriate soccer players in the United States
Indoor soccer goalkeepers